The 2006 Allan Cup was the Canadian senior ice hockey championship for the 2005–06 senior "AAA" season.  The event was hosted by the Powell River Regals in Powell River, British Columbia.  The 2006 tournament marked the 98th year that the Allan Cup has been awarded.

Teams
Fort Hotel Chiefs (Pacific)
Powell River Regals (Host)
Shawinigan Xtreme (Quebec)
Trail Smoke Eaters (Wild Card)
Weyburn Devils (West)
Whitby Dunlops (Ontario)

Results
Round Robin
Trail Smoke Eaters 4 - Weyburn Devils 2
Powell River Regals 4 - Fort Hotel Chiefs 2
Weyburn Devils 5 - Whitby Dunlops 4
Shawinigan Xtreme 8 - Fort Hotel Chiefs 2
Whitby Dunlops 9 - Trail Smoke Eaters 5
Powell River Regals 2 - Shawinigan Xtreme 1 (OT)
Quarter-final
Fort Hotel Chiefs 5 - Weyburn Devils 2
Trail Smoke Eaters 3 - Shawinigan Xtreme 2
Semi-final
Whitby Dunlops 4 - Fort Hotel Chiefs 0
Powell River Regals 7 - Trail Smoke Eaters 1
Final
Powell River Regals 7 - Whitby Dunlops 1

External links
2006 Allan Cup website 
Allan Cup website

Allan Cup
Allan